Kayunga District is a district in Central Uganda. It is named after its chief town, Kayunga.

Geography
Kayunga District is bordered by Amolatar District to the north, Buyende District to the northeast, Kamuli District to the east, Jinja District to the southeast, Buikwe District to the south, Mukono District to the southwest, Luweero District to the west, and Nakasongola District to the northwest.

Overview
Kayunga District was carved out of Mukono District in December 2000. The district consists of two counties, Bbaale County and Ntenjeru County.

Population
In 2012, the district population was estimated at about 358,700, up from 236,200 in 1991 and 294,600 in 2002. According to 2014 National Housing and Population census, the Kayunga population was about 368,064 with 181,920 (49%) males and 186,142 (51%) females. At that time the population density was 231 persons per sq. km.

Members of over 75% of the tribes of Uganda reside in the district.

Economic activity 
Agriculture is the main economic activity and represents 90% of total employment. Kayunga practices animal husbandry and crop husbandry, primarily as subsistence agriculture. Crops  include:

 Vanilla
 Cassava
 Matooke
 Pineapples
 Maize
 Millet
 Watermelon
 Passion fruit
,About 30% of the arable land of Kayunga district is used for commercial sugar cane, led by the Mehta and Madhvani families.These investors acquired large chunks of land leaving some residents landless. Media covered land wrangles that involve some members of district administration, politicians and locals.

History

In September 2009, Kayunga attempted to secede from the traditional Kingdom of Buganda. The King attempted to visit the district, but was banned by the Ugandan government, provoking riots in Kampala. Thirty people were killed.

See also
 Central Region, Uganda
 Districts of Uganda

References

External links
 Kayunga District Portal
Kayunga District Five Year Development Plan
Rural Initiative for Development and Empowerment, Kayunga District, Uganda

 
Districts of Uganda
Central Region, Uganda
Lake Kyoga
White Nile